This is a list of amphibians found in El Salvador. 29 amphibian species have been registered in El Salvador, which are grouped in 2 orders: salamanders (Caudata) and frogs and toads (Anura).  No caecilian (Gymnophiona) species have been registered. This list is derived from the database listing of AmphibiaWeb.

Salamanders (Caudata)

Plethodontidae 
Order: Caudata. 
Family: Plethodontidae
Bolitoglossa heiroreias (EN)
Bolitoglossa salvinii (EN)
Bolitoglossa synoria (CR)
Oedipina taylori (LC)

Toads and frogs (Anura)

Bufonidae 
Order: Anura. 
Family: Bufonidae
Incilius canaliferus (LC)
Incilius coccifer (LC)
Incilius luetkenii (LC)
Rhinella marina (LC)

Centrolenidae 
Order: Anura. 
Family: Centrolenidae
Hyalinobatrachium fleischmanni (LC)

Craugastoridae 
Order: Anura. 
Family: Craugastoridae
Craugastor rhodopis (VU)

Dermophiidae 
Order: Anura. 
Family: Dermophiidae
Dermophis mexicanus (VU)

Hylidae 
Order: Anura. 
Family: Hylidae
Agalychnis moreletii (CR)
Dendropsophus robertmertensi (LC)
Exerodonta catracha (EN)
Plectrohyla glandulosa (EN)
Plectrohyla guatemalensis (CR)
Plectrohyla psiloderma (EN)
Plectrohyla sagorum (EN)
Ptychohyla euthysanota (NT)
Ptychohyla salvadorensis (EN)
Scinax staufferi (LC)
Smilisca baudinii (LC)

Leptodactylidae 
Order: Anura. 
Family: Leptodactylidae
Engystomops pustulosus (LC)
Leptodactylus fragilis (LC)
Leptodactylus melanonotus (LC)

Microhylidae 
Order: Anura. 
Family: Microhylidae
Gastrophryne usta (LC)
Hypopachus barberi (VU)

Ranidae 
Order: Anura. 
Family: Ranidae
Rana maculata (LC)

Rhinophrynidae 
Order: Anura. 
Family: Rhinophrynidae
Rhinophrynus dorsalis (LC)

Notes

References 

 
Amphibians
El Salvador
El Salvador